Yelkovo is a village in Soskovsky District of Oryol Oblast, Russia.

References

Rural localities in Oryol Oblast